Richard Kenneth Davis (July 27, 1942 – November 7, 2019) was a former American football linebacker in the National Football League. He was drafted by both the San Diego Chargers of the AFL and the Baltimore Colts of the NFL in 1964 but chose to play for the Colts. Ted was then drafted by the Saints in the 1967 NFL Expansion Draft and was one of the original New Orleans Saints players. He played for the New Orleans Saints from 1967 to 1969 and he finished his career with the Miami Dolphins in 1970. He was also a football actor in the 1969 Charlton Heston movie Number One featuring the New Orleans Saints.

Ted played collegiately at the wide receiver/end position from 1961 to 1963 for Georgia Tech and was inducted into the Georgia Tech Hall of Fame in 1980. He recorded 19 receptions for 324 yards while in college.

During his senior year, he was involved in an incident during the Georgia Tech / Auburn game on October 19, 1963 in which he kicked Auburn halfback David Rawson in the face during the fourth quarter. The officials penalized Ted Davis and Rawson ended up having to go to the hospital. The following Monday, Ted Davis publicly apologized and owned up to his mistake made in anger during the game. He submitted his resignation to Coach Bobby Dodd and the Georgia Tech football team wishing to save Georgia Tech from the embarrassment of having to kick him off the team. He admitted that his actions violated every standard Coach Dodd had set for the team and he asked for Rawson's forgiveness. Ted was well respected at Georgia Tech and owned up to his mistake.

This incident was reminiscent of the so called "Chick Granning-Darwin Holt Incident" from the Georgia Tech / Alabama game two years earlier but the outcomes were quite different. During this incident "an Alabama player damaged a Tech player in the heat of battle" by elbowing him in the face. Apparently this elbowing incident by Holt resulted in Granning being hospitalized and unable to play football for the rest of the year. Holt apologized for the incident but no further action was taken by the SEC or Alabama and he remained on the team.

Ted Davis worked as a Football Umpire in the SEC from 1984 until at least 1989. In 1980, he became a veterinarian in Knoxville, TN where he owned his own clinic  until retiring in 2010.

References

External links
 

1942 births
2019 deaths
Players of American football from Memphis, Tennessee
American football linebackers
Georgia Tech Yellow Jackets football players
Baltimore Colts players
New Orleans Saints players
Miami Dolphins players